Rebekka Eschen Danielsen (born 10 March 2000) is a Faroese football defender who currently plays for Hinna and the Faroe Islands women's national football team.

References 

2000 births
Living people
Faroese women's footballers
Faroe Islands women's youth international footballers
Faroe Islands women's international footballers
Women's association football defenders
Faroese expatriate footballers
Expatriate women's footballers in Norway
Faroese expatriate sportspeople in Norway